Local government elections took place in London on 1 November 1906.

All council seats in all 28 metropolitan boroughs were up for election.

The results were a landslide victory for the Conservatives, who stood as Municipal Reformers. Prior to the election, a central Municipal Reform Committee had been formed in September 1906, and the new organisation absorbed the former Moderate Party, who formed the opposition to the Progressives on the county council, as well as groups on the borough councils that opposed what they termed the "Progressive-Socialist Party".

The Municipal Reformers won 22 boroughs. This compared to three for the Liberals, who stood as Progressives, two for Independents and the nascent Labour Party losing its only borough, Woolwich.

Political control
Summary of council election results:

References

Council elections in Greater London
Elections in London
1906 in London
1906 English local elections
November 1906 events